Good for Nothing is a 2014 comedy film written and directed by Gianni Di Gregorio. It premiered at the 2014 Rome Film Festival.

Plot 
Rome. Gianni Brandani is a meek man on the verge of retirement who works as a clerk in an "Italian-style" public facility, doing little or nothing. At home he has to deal with the bulky presence of his ex-wife, the daughter who has just started a family and the gruff elderly tenant downstairs.

Suddenly he receives the news that to get the pension he will have to work another three years in a modern and more efficient branch. In this branch all its limitations and backwardness come out.

Among the new colleagues is Marco, a good, docile and very efficient man who does favors to all the others, who take advantage of the fact that he cannot say no. He is also in love with the busty colleague Cinzia, younger than him, who deludes him. Gianni and Marco make friends, and learn to be respected by everyone.

Cast 

Gianni Di Gregorio as  Gianni
Marco Marzocca  as Marco 
Valentina Lodovini as  Cinzia
Marco Messeri as  Raffaele
Daniela Giordano as Marta
 Gianfelice Imparato as  Christian
Camilla Filippi as  Camilla
Anna Bonaiuto as  The Boss

See also 
 List of Italian films of 2014

References

External links 

2014 comedy films
Italian comedy films
Films directed by Gianni Di Gregorio
Films set in Rome
2010s Italian films